Chaetosphaeria elegans is a fungus species in the genus Chaetosphaeria.

References

External links 
 Chaetosphaeria elegans at MycoBank
 Chaetosphaeria elegans at CyberTruffle
 Chaetosphaeria elegans at Encyclopedia of Life

Chaetosphaeriales
Fungi described in 1906